Year 4 is an educational year group in schools in many countries including England, Wales, Australia and New Zealand. It is usually the fourth year of compulsory education and incorporates students aged between eight and nine however some kids who are in Year 4 can be considered as grade 2 in America or Canada but if the kid who was born after September 2nd and grade 2, they will be replaced as Year 3.

Australia
In Australia, Year 4 is usually the fifth year of compulsory education. Although there are slight variations between the states, most children in Year 4 are aged between nine and ten.

New Zealand
In New Zealand, Year 4 is the fourth year of compulsory education. Children are aged eight or nine in this year group.
 Year 4 pupils are usually educated in Primary schools or in Area schools.

United Kingdom

England
In schools in England Year 4 is the fourth year after Reception. It is the fourth full year of compulsory education, with children being admitted who are aged 8 before 1 September in any given academic year. It is also the second year of Key Stage 2 in which the National Curriculum is taught.  Year 4 is usually the fifth year of primary school or the second year group in a Junior School.

Wales
In schools in Wales Year 4 is the fourth year after Reception. It is currently the fourth full year of compulsory education, with children being admitted who are aged 8 before 1 September in any given academic year. It is the second year group in Key Stage 2.

Northern Ireland and Scotland

In Northern Ireland and Scotland, the fourth year of compulsory education is called Primary 4, and pupils generally start at the age of 7.

References

4